Cui Xingwu, 崔兴五, (1885 - 1948); Chinese officer in the army defending Rehe in the Second Sino-Japanese War that defected with his brigade to the Japanese and joined the Army of Manchukuo.

Cui Xingwu was an officer in the 55th Army of Rehe province under its governor Tang Yulin. In February 1933 while commanding the 9th Cavalry Brigade at Kailu in the Battle of Rehe, Cui defected to the Japanese invaders with his whole unit.  Later in April with puppet forces of Liu Guitang and Li Shouxin and the Japanese 4th Cavalry Brigade Cui moved into eastern Chahar Province.  His force captured several cities but was defeated and driven out of Chahar by the Chahar People's Anti-Japanese Army.

See also 
 Actions in Inner Mongolia (1933-36)

Sources 
 Jowett, Phillip S., Rays of The Rising Sun, Armed Forces of Japan's Asian Allies 1931–45, Volume I: China & Manchuria, 2004. Helion & Co. Ltd., 26 Willow Rd., Solihull, West Midlands, England.
 中国抗日战争正面战场作战记 (China's Anti-Japanese War Combat Operations)
 Guo Rugui, editor-in-chief Huang Yuzhang
 Jiangsu People's Publishing House
 Date published : 2005-7-1
 
 Online in Chinese: https://web.archive.org/web/20090116005113/http://www.wehoo.net/book/wlwh/a30012/A0170.htm

Military personnel of the Second Sino-Japanese War
Chinese military personnel of World War II
Chinese collaborators with Imperial Japan